"Speed" is a song by French artist Zazie released in 2018. The song has peaked at number two on the French Singles Charts.

Charts

References

2018 singles
2018 songs
French-language songs
French pop songs
Zazie songs
Songs written by Zazie